Bogusz is a Polish surname and place name. It is derived from Bogusław. The surname is found across Poland. It is related to the place name Bogusze and the surname Bohusz (featuring a 'g' → 'h' mutation which is more frequent south and east of Poland). Bogusz may refer to:
 Bogusz coat of arms
 Daniel Bogusz (born 1974), Polish footballer
 Ryszard Bogusz (born 1951), Polish theologian
 Mateusz Bogusz (born 2001), Polish footballer 
 Matthew Bogusz (born 1986), mayor of Des Plaines, Illinois
 Place names
 Siedliska-Bogusz, in Poland

References

See also
 

Polish-language surnames